Eureka Airport may refer to:

 Eureka Aerodrome in Eureka, Nunavut, Canada
 Eureka Airport (Nevada) in Eureka, Nevada, United States
 Arcata-Eureka Airport, a commercial airport serving Arcata & Eureka, California, United States
 Eureka Municipal Airport (California), a general-aviation airport serving Eureka, California, United States (FAA: O33)
 Eureka Municipal Airport (Kansas), an airport serving Eureka, Kansas, United States (FAA: 13K)
 Eureka Municipal Airport (South Dakota), an airport serving Eureka, South Dakota, United States (FAA: 3W8)

See also
 Eureka Municipal Airport (disambiguation)